Corylophidae is a family of minute hooded beetles, sometimes called minute fungus beetles, in the superfamily Coccinelloidea. There are about 18 genera and at least 120 described species in Corylophidae. They feed on microfungi such as molds, and are often found associated with bark, as well as in leaf litter and other decaying vegetation. In older literature, the family name was often given as Orthoperidae.

Genera
 Aenigmaticum Matthews, 1888 i c g b
 Aposericoderus Paulian, 1950 g
 Arthrolipes g
 Arthrolips Wollaston, 1854 i c g b
 Clypastraea Haldeman, 1842 i c g b
 Clypastrea g
 Corylophus Leach, 1833 g
 Foadia Pakaluk, 1985 i c g
 Gloeosoma Wollaston, 1854 i c g b
 Holopsis Broun, 1883 i c g b
 Hoplicnema Matthews, 1899 g
 Microstagetus Wollaston, 1861 i c g b
 Orthoperus Stephens, 1829 i c g b
 Rypobius LeConte, 1852 i c g b
 Sericoderus Stephens, 1829 i c g b
 Stanus Ślipiński, Tomaszewska & Lawrence, 2009 g
 Teplinus Pakaluk, Slipinski & Lawrence, 1994 g
 Weirus Slipinski, Tomaszewska and Lawrence, 2009 i c g
Xenostanus Li et al. 2022 Burmese amber, Myanmar, mid Cretaceous (latest Albian - earliest Cenomanian)
Data sources: i = ITIS, c = Catalogue of Life, g = GBIF, b = Bugguide.net

References

Further reading

External links
 

 
Coccinelloidea
Polyphaga families